Stuart Albert Cartwright (7 September 1919 – 6 March 1996) was  a former Australian rules footballer who played with Richmond in the Victorian Football League (VFL).

Notes

External links 

1919 births
1996 deaths
Australian rules footballers from Victoria (Australia)
Richmond Football Club players